Andrew Weisblum (born November 7, 1971) is an American film and visual effects editor. He has collaborated frequently with directors Darren Aronofsky and Wes Anderson. Weisblum was nominated for two American Cinema Editors Eddie Awards for Best Edited Animated Feature Film, for his work on Fantastic Mr. Fox (2009) and Isle of Dogs (2018); and two Academy Awards for Best Film Editing, for his work on Black Swan (2010) and Tick, Tick... Boom! (2021, with co-editor Myron Kerstein).

Filmography

Visual effects editor
Chicago (2002)
The Fountain (2006)
Film editor
Coney Island Baby (2003)
Undermind (2003)
Broken English (2007)
Dear Lemon Lima (2007) – short film and precursor to feature film Dear Lemon Lima
The Darjeeling Limited (2007)
The Wrestler (2008)
Fantastic Mr. Fox (2009) – supervising editor
Black Swan (2010)
Moonrise Kingdom (2012) 
The East (2013) – worked with Bill Pankow
Noah (2014)
Alice Through the Looking Glass (2016)
Mother! (2017)
Isle of Dogs (2018) 
The Eyes of Tammy Faye (2021)
The French Dispatch (2021) 
tick, tick... Boom! (2021)
The Good Nurse (2022)
The Whale (2022)

References

External links
Contender – Editor, Andrew Weisblum, The Wrestler
Darren Aronofsky Wrestles With Andrew Weisblum

American film editors
Living people
1971 births